The Vierde Divisie, formerly known as Hoofdklasse is the second-highest league of amateur football in the Netherlands, and the fifth tier in general.

Background
The league is divided into two sections: Saturday and Sunday. This is a result of the traditional pillarisation, the segregation of Dutch society. The Saturday clubs are mainly Protestant Christian clubs, who were not allowed to play on Sunday. The Sunday clubs were in general Catholic and working class clubs, whose players had to work on Saturday and therefore could only play on Sunday. Although the pillarisation ended in the 1960s and 1970s, the clubs and the league have maintained this division. The Saturday Hoofdklasse and the Sunday Hoofdklasse are divided into two leagues each since the 2016–17 season:
 Clubs in the Saturday Hoofdklasse A and Sunday Hoofdklasse A are from the central, northern and western parts of the Netherlands.
 Clubs in the Saturday Hoofdklasse B and Sunday Hoofdklasse B are from the central, eastern and southern parts of the Netherlands.
The champions of the Saturday Hoofdklasse A, B and C played against each other for the national Saturday championship, just like the champions of the Sunday Hoofdklasse A, B and C faced each other for the national Sunday title until 2015. The winners of the Saturday and Sunday championships faced each other for the Hoofdklasse title until 2010, when the Topklasse decided the overall amateur champion, and in 2016 the overall championship was abolished. The transitional 2015–16 season had the period winners contest the 15th placers of the Topklasse and the 12th and 13th placers played the period winners of the 1e Klasse, all in playouts, while the 14th and 15th placers were relegated and the Hoofdklasse contracted to four leagues of 16 clubs each (two each for Saturday and Sunday).

Since the 2016–17 season, clubs can be relegated from the Hoofdklasse to the 1e Klasse (First Class) and can be promoted from the 1e Klasse to the Hoofdklasse. The champion and playoff winners of each Hoofdklasse are promoted to the Derde Divisie (formerly Topklasse), and two to three teams from each Derde Divisie (four to six in total) are relegated to the Hoofdklasse.

Before this, it was only possible for Hoofdklasse clubs to be admitted to the Eerste Divisie after application and licensing. The last clubs to have done so are FC Omniworld (2005) and AGOVV Apeldoorn (2003).

In 2022, the KNVB made the decision to rename the competition to Vierde Divisie.

Hoofdklasse champions since 1975

Saturday titles since 1975

Sunday titles since 1975

National titles 1975–2010

By club

By day

References

 
5
Neth